Melissa Wells may refer to: 
Melissa Wells (politician), American politician in the Maryland House of Delegates
Melissa F. Wells (born 1932), U.S. diplomat
Melissa Walton (married name Wells, born 1990), British actress
Melissa "Wellsy" Wells, portrayed by sportscaster Danyelle Sargent on the U.S. television show Onion SportsDome